Bon-e Navizan (also Romanized as Bon-e Navīzān) is a village in Nargesan Rural District, Jebalbarez-e Jonubi District, Anbarabad County, Kerman Province, Iran. In 2006, its population was 44, in 10 families.

References 

Populated places in Anbarabad County